Uthman Quran may refer to:
Uthman Quran is an old manuscript of Quran.
Uthman Taha Quran is a modern Mus'haf of Quran.